Gurankesh-e Abd ol Rahman (also Romanized as Gūrānkesh-e ‘Abd ol Raḩmān and Gūrānkosh-e ‘Abd or Raḩmān; also known as Gorān Kash, Gowrān Kash-e Pā’īn, Gūrānkesh-e Pā’īn, Gūrān Kesh-e Pā’īn, Gūrānkosh, Gūrān Kosh-e Pā’īn, Kūrān Kash, Kūrānkoch-e Pāīn, and Kūrānkosh) is a village in Kambel-e Soleyman Rural District, in the Central District of Chabahar County, Sistan and Baluchestan Province, Iran. At the 2006 census, its population was 165, in 33 families.

References 

Populated places in Chabahar County